The 2012–13 TT Pro League season (known as the Digicel Pro League for sponsorship reasons) was the fourteenth season of the TT Pro League, the Trinidad and Tobago professional league for association football clubs, since its establishment in 1999. A total of eight teams contested the league, with W Connection the defending champions. The season began on 14 September 2012 and ended on 10 May 2013 with the crowning of Defence Force as the league champion.

Speaking on the number of clubs in the Pro League prior to the start of the season, CEO Dexter Skeene stated in an interview that he feels the country's best footballing interests are served by an eight-team league. On 30 June 2012, San Juan Jabloteh announced that due to financial constraints the club suspended their football operations. As a result, the four-time Pro League champion, San Juan Kings, did not participate for the first time in the league's history. In response, a new club established by Brent Sancho to represent the Central region of the country, Central FC, was formed and officially applied for Pro League membership on 25 July 2012. The club is officially based in California and plays its home games in Ato Boldon Stadium. Central was admitted into the league on 6 September 2012 and became the 21st team to compete in the Pro League.

The first goal of the season was scored by two-time Golden Boot winner Devorn Jorsling of Defence Force against St. Ann's Rangers in the thirty-second minute of the first game on 14 September 2012. Bevon Bass of T&TEC scored the first hat-trick of the season as the Electricity Boys defeated St. Ann's Rangers 3–2 on 20 October 2012. Jorsling went on to claim an unprecedented third Golden Boot award after leading the league with 21 goals scored for Defence Force.

On 6 May 2013, Defence Force secured the TT Pro League championship following a Caledonia AIA 2–1 loss to Central FC in Couva. The league title was the Teteron Boys second in three seasons and marked their third Pro League title overall. Consequently, Defence Force and Caledonia AIA, having finished as runners-up, earned places within the 2014 CFU Club Championship. Following the season, T&TEC withdrew from the league citing financial struggles to field a professional football club. The Electricity Boys became the seventh team to leave the league in the previous four years.

Changes from the 2011–12 season
The following changes were made since the 2011–12 season:
A new competition was introduced to open the Pro League season. The Charity Shield will contest the defending league champions and the winner of the previous year's Pro Bowl.
If the league champion also wins the Pro Bowl competition, then the Charity Shield will be contested by the top two teams in the previous league season.
Clubs have the option to postpone their scheduled match if the club stands without three or more players on international duty.
There were a number of changes to the clubs competing in the 2012–13 season.
San Juan Jabloteh suspended their football club operations and withdrew from the league.
After ending its two-year sponsorship with North East Stars, DirecTV and W Connection agreed to an undisclosed deal on 13 July 2012 to sponsor the Couva-based club.
Central FC, a new club based in the Central region of the country, officially applied for membership into the league on 25 July 2012.
The California-based club was officially admitted into the league on 6 September 2012 and intends to play its home matches in Ato Boldon Stadium.

Teams

Team summaries

Note: Flags indicate national team as has been defined under FIFA eligibility rules. Players may hold more than one non-FIFA nationality.

Player transfers

Managerial changes

League table

Positions by round

 Results 

Matches 1–14

Matches 15–21

Season statistics

Scoring
 First goal of the season: Devorn Jorsling for Defence Force against St. Ann's Rangers, 14 September 2012.
 Last goal of the season: Jerwyn Balthazar for Defence Force against T&TEC, 10 May 2013.
 First own goal of the season: Daneil Cyrus (W Connection) for Defence Force. (21 December 2012)
 First penalty kick of the season: Richard Roy (scored) for Defence Force against St. Ann's Rangers, 14 September 2012.
 First hat-trick of the season: Bevon Bass (T&TEC) against St. Ann's Rangers, 5', 29', 42' (20 October 2012)
 Most goals scored by one player in a match: 4 goals Peter Byers (Central FC) against T&TEC, 41', 59', 80', 86' (16 March 2013)
 Widest winning margin: 8 goals Defence Force 8–0 St. Ann's Rangers (4 January 2013)
 Most goals in a match: 8 goals 
 Defence Force 8–0 St. Ann's Rangers (4 January 2013)
 Most goals in one half: 6 goals Defence Force v W Connection (21 December 2012) 0–0 at half-time, 5–1 final.
 Most goals in one half by a single team: 5 goals Defence Force v W Connection (21 December 2012) 0–0 at half-time, 5–1 final.
 T&TEC v North East Stars (6 May 2013) 0–0 at half-time, 0–5 final.

Top scorers

Hat-tricks

 * Home team score first in result
 4 Player scored four goals

Discipline
 First yellow card of the season: Jason Marcano for St. Ann's Rangers against Defence Force, 14 September 2012.
 First red card of the season: Glen Sutton for T&TEC against Caledonia AIA, 3 November 2012.
 Most yellow cards in a single match: 8 North East Stars 0–0 Central FC – 5 for North East Stars (Kareem Moses (2), Glenton Wolfe, Jeromie Williams & Elijah Manners) and 3 for Central FC (Wesley John, Johan Peltier & Darren Mitchell) (6 March 2013)
 Most red cards in a single match: 3'
 Defence Force 3–0 Central FC – 1 for Defence Force (Keston Williams) and 2 for Central FC (Marvin Phillip & Wesley John) (5 April 2013)

Awards

Monthly awards

References

External links
Official Website
Soca Warriors Online, TT Pro League

TT Pro League seasons
1
Trinidad